Oppression is a board game published in 1986 by Midson Holdings.

Contents
Oppression is a game in which each player moves around the circular track on the board, and tries land on properties and assets to obtain them.

Reception
Brian Walker reviewed Oppression for Games International magazine, and gave it 3 stars out of 5, and stated that "As the cover of the rule book states: 'WARNING! You may find this game to be offensive'. Well, do you?"

References

Board games introduced in 1986